Diego Fernando Rodríguez López (born 6 November 1995) is a Honduran professional footballer who plays as a left-back for Motagua and the Honduras national team.

Career 
Rodríguez made his professional debut with Olimpia in a 0–0 Liga Nacional tie with C.D.S. Vida on 14 August 2017. On 15 January 2021, he signed with Motagua.

International career
Rodríguez made his senior debut with the Honduras national team in a friendly 1–1 tie with Belarus on 24 March 2021.

References

External links
 

1995 births
Living people
Sportspeople from Tegucigalpa
Honduran footballers
Honduras international footballers
Association football fullbacks
F.C. Motagua players
Platense F.C. players
C.D. Olimpia players
Liga Nacional de Fútbol Profesional de Honduras players
2021 CONCACAF Gold Cup players